Telejornal may refer to:

 Telejornal (Angola), an Angolan national newscast on TPA
 Telejornal (Macau), a Macanese Portuguese language newscast on TDM
 Telejornal (Mozambique), a Mozambican national newscast on TVM
 Telejornal (Portugal), a Portuguese national newscast on RTP1

See also
 Telejournal (disambiguation)